Bambusa latideltata is a species of Bambusa bamboo.

Distribution
Bambusa latideltata is endemic to Guangdong province of China.

References 

latideltata